Todd Michael Revenig (born June 28, 1969) is an American former professional baseball pitcher. He played for the Oakland Athletics during the  season appearing in two games. He spent much of his career playing in the Chinese Professional Baseball League and the minor leagues.

Career
Revenig began his professional career in the Oakland Athletics organization in 1990. After a dominant rise through the minor leagues, Revenig was promoted to the majors in 1992, making his major league debut on August 24, 1992 and only appearing in one other MLB game on August 31. Revenig missed the 1993 season due to injury and remained in the Athletics' minor league system through the 1995 season. After 1995, Revenig signed a minor league contract with the Baltimore Orioles organization, and played for the Double-A Bowie Baysox and Triple-A Rochester Red Wings. He became a free agent after the 2006 season and signed with the Wei Chuan Dragons of the Chinese Professional Baseball League. Revenig played with the Dragons from 1997 to 1999, appearing in 64 total games and registering a 3.99 ERA. Revenig also won the Taiwan Series in all three seasons with Wei Chuan. In 2000, Revenig signed with the Arizona Diamondbacks organization, and appeared with three different minor league affiliates. In 2001, he played for the Triple-A Tucson Sidewinders before becoming a free agent after the season. In 2002, Revenig played in 7 games for the Piratas de Campeche of the Mexican League.

References

Major League Baseball pitchers
Oakland Athletics players
Minnesota State Mavericks baseball players
Baseball players from Minnesota
People from Brainerd, Minnesota
1969 births
Living people
Algodoneros de Unión Laguna players
Arizona League Athletics players
Bowie Baysox players
Edmonton Trappers players
El Paso Diablos players
Huntsville Stars players
Madison Muskies players
Piratas de Campeche players
Rochester Red Wings players
Southern Oregon A's players
Tucson Sidewinders players
Wei Chuan Dragons players
American expatriate baseball players in Canada
American expatriate baseball players in Mexico
American expatriate baseball players in Taiwan

Minnesota State University, Mankato alumni